Fall River Township is a township in Wilson County, Kansas, in the United States.

History
Some of the first settlements in Fall River Township were built on the Fall River, hence the name.

References

Townships in Wilson County, Kansas
Townships in Kansas